Phlapphla Chai is the name of a road in Bangkok's Pom Prap and Wat Thep Sirin sub-districts, Pom Prap Sattru Phai District, and also the five-way intersection of the road with Luang and Maitri Chit Roads. It is also the name of the surrounding area and considered as a part of Bangkok's Chinatown.

The road
Phlapphla Chai Road separates from the left side of Charoen Krung Road at Plaeng Nam Intersection, extending and running north, intersecting Luang and Maitri Chit Roads at Phlapphla Chai Intersection and continuing north until it reaches Bamrung Mueang Road in the Suan Mali quarter, with a total distance of about 1.1 km (0.68 mi). 

BMTA's bus line 53 (inner city loop) is the only one running on this road (only in the section between Phlapphla Chai Intersection and the end of the road).

Bordering the road are Li Ti Meow Shrine, Wat Khanikaphon, Poh Teck Tung Foundation, Phlapphla Chai Police Stations 1 and 2, Tai Hong Kong Shrine, and Wat Thepsirin.

History
The name Phlapphla Chai comes from Wat Phlapphla Chai (วัดพลับพลาไชย), a wat (Thai temple) site on the corner of intersection. The temple was built in the Ayutthaya period and was originally known as Wat Khok (วัดโคก). The area around the temple used to be execution grounds, and many human skeletons have been found. In addition, the edge of the temple was the location of Pom Prap Sattru Phai, one of the eight forts built along the canal Khlong Phadung Krung Kasem in the reign of King Mongkut (Rama IV); it gave its name to the present Pom Prap Sattru Phai District. The new name of Wat Phalpphla Chai was given later during the reign of King Vajiravudh (Rama VI), during which it was used as a practice field for the king's Wild Tiger Corps.  The word phlapphla means 'pavilion' and "Wat Phlapphla Chai" translates to 'Victory Pavilion Temple', referring to the pavillion of King Phutthayotfa Chulalok (Rama I), which was set up in the area while he was Chao Phraya Maha Kasat Suek (his highest title before becoming king), having returned from a war against the Khmers in 1782.

Phlappla Chai Road was built in the reign of King Chulalongkorn (Rama V). It was not built straight due to obstruction by the Meng Soon Building, whose owner was under the protection of France, which had extraterritorial rights, and did not allow his land to be expropriated.

In the evening on 3 July 1974, Phlapphla Chai was the site of the "Chinatown Riots", which left 26 dead and more than 120 injured. The riots started when two police officers arrested a taxi driver for illegal parking. He resisted and yelled that they were beating him. His yelling caused crowds to gather at Phlapphla Chai Police Station, eventually escalating into a riot and spread to nearby areas such as Hua Lamphong, the 22 July Circle, King Chulalongkorn Memorial Hospital, Rama IV Road, and Wang Burapha. Protesters burned public places, threw bombs, and fired at police officers, who were unable to control the situation. The riots continued for four days until the government of prime minister Sanya Dharmasakti declared a state of emergency. The incident finally ended after soldiers and police used force to quell the rioters. The incident is considered to be the first people's uprising since the October 14 event in the previous year.

Phlapphla Chai is one of the areas most populated by those of Thai Chinese descent. It is not far from Yaowarat or Charoen Krung Roads and contains a number of restaurants and street food vendors in the surrounding area. Some of them were chosen to be Bib Gourmand from Michelin Guide as well. In addition, in the past it was known as the centre of photography equipment stores. 

Chinese businessman Hong Taechawanit donated his mansion in Phlapphla Chai to the government and it became the present-day Phlapphlachai police station.

References 

Road junctions in Bangkok
Pom Prap Sattru Phai district
Streets in Bangkok
Neighbourhoods of Bangkok